Bianka Szíjgyártó is a former Hungarian competitive ice dancer. She is a two time Hungarian national champion. With Szilárd Tóth, she won her 1st national title. The duo competed in the final segment at the 1997 European Championships in Paris, France, and at the 1997 World Championships in Lausanne, Switzerland. When that partnership ended, she teamed up with Tamás Sári. She won her 2nd national title with him and the team competed in the final segment at the 1999 European Championships in Prague, Czech Republic. They trained in Budapest, Hungary and were coached by Gabriella Remport and Sándor Nagy.

After retiring from competition, Szíjgyártó skated professionally in ice shows. She coaches at Cornerstone Ice Arena in Lockport, NY

Programs

With Sári

With Tóth

Results

With Sári

With Tóth

References

1981 births
Hungarian female ice dancers
Living people
Sportspeople from Debrecen